The  2005 ASP World Tour is a professional competitive surfing league.  It is run by the Association of Surfing Professionals.

Men's World Tour

Tournaments
Source

Final standings
Source

Women's World Tour

Tournaments
Source

| (*)denotes event wildcard

Final standings
Source

External links
 Official Site

World Surf League
ASP World Tour